The 2020 AFC Cup qualifying play-offs were played from 21 January to 26 February 2020, before the remaining matches were suspended, and eventually cancelled by the AFC on 10 September 2020 due to the COVID-19 pandemic. Under the original competition format, a total of 19 teams would compete in the qualifying play-offs to decide seven of the 36 places in the group stage of the 2020 AFC Cup.

Teams
The following 19 teams, split into five zones (West Asia Zone, Central Asia Zone, South Asia Zone, ASEAN Zone, East Asia Zone), entered the qualifying play-offs, consisting of three rounds:
2 teams entered in the preliminary round 1.
7 teams entered in the preliminary round 2.
10 teams entered in the play-off round.

Format

In the qualifying play-offs, each tie was played on a home-and-away two-legged basis. The away goals rule, extra time (away goals would not apply in extra time) and penalty shoot-out would be used to decide the winner if necessary (Regulations Article 9.3).

Schedule
The original schedule of each round was as follows.

Effects of the COVID-19 pandemic
The East Asia Zone preliminary round 2 first leg between Ulaanbaatar City and Taipower, originally scheduled to be played on 5 February 2020 and hosted by Ulaanbaatar City, was not played as scheduled because the Mongolian government had banned Chinese nationals, including people from Taiwan, from entering Mongolia due to the COVID-19 pandemic in Asia.

The AFC announced on 11 February 2020 that the East Asia Zone preliminary round and play-off round matches would be postponed to 7 and 14 April, and 21 and 28 April.

The AFC announced on 18 March 2020 that all matches would be postponed until further notice.

On 9 July 2020, the AFC announced the new schedule for the remaining matches. The tie between Taipower and Ulaanbaatar City, now in the play-off round after Tai Po's withdrawal, would be played as a single match on 30 September, later rescheduled to 16 October, and hosted by Taipower as they were from the higher-ranked association.

The AFC announced the cancellation of the remainder of the competition on 10 September 2020, due to logistics in coordinating the five zones.

Bracket

The bracket of the qualifying play-offs for each zone was determined based on the association ranking of each team, with the team from the higher-ranked association hosting the second leg. The seven winners of the play-off round (one each from West Asia Zone, Central Asia Zone, South Asia Zone, East Asia Zone, and three from ASEAN Zone) would advance to the group stage to join the 29 direct entrants.

Play-off West Asia
 Hilal Al-Quds advanced to Group A.

Play-off Central Asia
 Khujand advanced to Group D.

Play-off South Asia
 Maziya advanced to Group E.

Play-off ASEAN 1
 PSM Makassar advanced to Group H.

Play-off ASEAN 2
 Yangon United advanced to Group F.

Play-off ASEAN 3
 Svay Rieng advanced to Group G.

Play-off East Asia
Winners would have advanced to Group I.

Preliminary round 1

Summary
A total of two teams played in the preliminary round 1.

|+South Asia Zone

South Asia Zone

5–5 on aggregate. Paro won on away goals.

Preliminary round 2

Summary
A total of 8 teams played in the preliminary round 2: seven teams which entered in this round, and one winner of the preliminary round 1.

|+Central Asia Zone

|+South Asia Zone

Notes

Central Asia Zone

Neftchi won on walkover after Ahal were disqualified by the AFC for failing to travel to Kyrgyzstan for the first leg due to concerns of the COVID-19 pandemic in Asia.

South Asia Zone

Bengaluru won 10–1 on aggregate.

2–2 on aggregate. Maziya won on away goals.

Play-off round

Summary
A total of 14 teams played in the play-off round: ten teams which entered in this round, and four winners of the preliminary round 2.

|+West Asia Zone

|+Central Asia Zone

|+South Asia Zone

|+ASEAN Zone

|+East Asia Zone

|}

West Asia Zone

Hilal Al-Quds won 2–0 on aggregate.

Central Asia Zone

Khujand won 3–1 on aggregate.

South Asia Zone

4–4 on aggregate. Maziya won 4–3 on penalties.

ASEAN Zone

PSM Makassar won 7–2 on aggregate.

Yangon United won 9–2 on aggregate.

Svay Rieng won 7–1 on aggregate.

East Asia Zone

Notes

References

External links
, the-AFC.com
AFC Cup 2020, stats.the-AFC.com

1
January 2020 sports events in Asia
February 2020 sports events in Asia